Kiritapu Demant (born 8 October 1996) is a New Zealand rugby union player.

Biography 
Demant made her international debut for New Zealand at the 2015 Women's Rugby Super Series, on 27 June against Canada at Calgary. In 2017, Demant represented the Cook Islands at the Women's Rugby League World Cup. In 2018 she played for the Cook Islands women's in rugby league nines at the Rugby League Commonwealth Championship.

Demant was named in the Black Ferns squad that toured France and the United States in 2018, she was also named in the two test matches against Australia later that year.

Demant's older sister, Ruahei, is also a Black Fern.

In November 2022, She joined the Blues Women for the 2023 Super Rugby Aupiki season.

References

External links 

 Black Ferns Profile

1996 births
Living people
New Zealand women's international rugby union players
New Zealand female rugby union players
Sportspeople from Whakatāne